Fall Creek Place is one of many revitalized neighborhoods in inner Indianapolis, Indiana, United States.  The neighborhood is bounded by Meridian Street on the west, Fall Creek Parkway on the north, just east of College Avenue on the east, and 22nd Street on the south.  Before the project's Phase IV began in 2006, its eastern boundary was Park Avenue.

The neighborhood consists of narrow, tree lined streets.  Victorian homes from the late 19th century are the most prevalent house type as well as new homes built in period design.  In the 1980s, the neighborhood fell into serious disrepair; entire city blocks were left abandoned.  In 2001, city efforts to redevelop the area into a mixed-income residential community began.  In 2003, the U.S. Department of Housing and Urban Development awarded Indianapolis with a Homeownership Zone Award for the way the city used a $4 million HUD grant to stimulate other public and private investment in the Fall Creek Place redevelopment.  Also in 2003, the American Planning Association selected Fall Creek Place as the winner of the 2003 Outstanding Planning Award for "Implementing Smart Growth."   In 2006, the National League of Cities gave Indianapolis the silver winner Award for Municipal Excellence for cities over 500,000 in population for the Fall Creek Place redevelopment project. and 

The area was previously nicknamed "Dodge City," referring to the infamous western town of Dodge City, Kansas where there were shootouts in the streets.  The area was plagued with frequent drive-bys during the 1980s and 1990s.

The Eastern boundary of Fall Creek Place was moved to the alley east of College Avenue in 2006. K-6 students are zoned to Indianapolis Public Schools 27 and 60.

See also
List of Indianapolis neighborhoods

External links

Fall Creek Place Homeowners Association

Neighborhoods in Indianapolis